The 1999 Central Asian Games also known as the 3rd Central Asian Games were held in Bishkek, Kyrgyzstan.

Chinese Taipei was invited to this edition.

Participating nations

Sports

Medal table

References

Central Asian Games
Central Asian Games, 1999
Central Asian Games, 1999
Central Asian Games
Sport in Bishkek
Multi-sport events in Kyrgyzstan
International sports competitions hosted by Kyrgyzstan